Aleksandr Danilovich Grinberg (1885–1979) was a photographer. In 1908 he was awarded the silver medal in the all-Russian photo exhibition in Moscow and the gold medal in the international photo-exhibition in Dresden.

Since 1929, the year of the "Great Break", with the turn in the Soviet politics toward arts, his erotic photography was declared inappropriate for Soviet morale, as a feature of the "overindulged idleness of the rich". Nevertheless, he risked exhibitions of semi-naked women, and was eventually sentenced to Gulag labor camps (1936–1939) "for distribution of pornography".

Filmography
 1921 — Story of Seven Who Were Hanged
 1926 — A Descendant of an Arab
 1927 — Three Friends and an Invention

References

External links
 

1885 births
1979 deaths
Photographers from the Russian Empire
Soviet photographers
Gulag detainees
Pictorialists
Soviet cinematographers
Imperial Moscow University alumni
Burials at Donskoye Cemetery